Mauro Numa (born 8 November 1961 in Mestre) is an Italian fencer and one of the strongest during the 1980s.His career started very early and in 1979, at 18, he was included in the Foil's Italian Team. In 1980 Numa could not compete at the Moscow Olympic Games due to the boycott.

Biography
In 1984 at 22 he competed at the Los Angeles Olympic Games winning gold in the individual and team foil events. In the final for the Individual Title Numa won over Matthias Behr. Less than 1 minute before the end Behr was 4 points up but Numa caught his opponent and eventually won in the tie break with the final score of 12-11.

In the following years Numa confirmed to be one of the strongest in Foil Individual winning medals in Clermont-Ferrand 1982, in Barcelona 1985, in Sofia 1986, in Denver 1989 World Championships.

Achievements

Fencing World Cup
  Foil (1982, 1983, 1985)

References

External links
 

1961 births
Living people
Italian male foil fencers
Olympic fencers of Italy
Fencers at the 1984 Summer Olympics
Fencers at the 1988 Summer Olympics
Fencers at the 1992 Summer Olympics
Olympic gold medalists for Italy
Olympic medalists in fencing
Sportspeople from Venice
Medalists at the 1984 Summer Olympics
Universiade medalists in fencing
Universiade silver medalists for Italy
Fencers of Centro Sportivo Carabinieri
Medalists at the 1983 Summer Universiade
Medalists at the 1989 Summer Universiade
People from Mestre-Carpenedo